Waterloo Corner is a rural/urban suburb approximately 22 kilometres north of Adelaide, the capital city of South Australia. Most of the land is used for agricultural purposes, including wheat, olives, grapes and tomatoes. Port Wakefield Road runs through the suburb and thus much heavy freight traverses the suburb.

Waterloo Corner Post Office closed in 1972.

References

Suburbs of Adelaide